In statistical mechanics, the radial distribution function, (or pair correlation function)  in a system of particles (atoms, molecules, colloids, etc.), describes how density varies as a function of distance from a reference particle.

This simplified definition holds for a homogeneous and isotropic system. A more general case will be considered below.

This general theme is depicted to the right, where the red particle is our reference particle, and blue particles are those whose centers are within the circular shell, dotted in orange.

The radial distribution function is usually determined by calculating the distance between all particle pairs and binning them into a histogram. The histogram is then normalized with respect to an ideal gas, where particle histograms are completely uncorrelated.

Given a potential energy function, the radial distribution function can be computed either via computer simulation methods like the Monte Carlo method, or via the Ornstein-Zernike equation, using approximative closure relations like the Percus-Yevick approximation or the Hypernetted Chain Theory. It can also be determined experimentally, by radiation scattering techniques or by direct visualization for large enough (micrometer-sized) particles via traditional or confocal microscopy.

The radial distribution function is of fundamental importance since it can be used, using the Kirkwood–Buff solution theory, to link the microscopic details to macroscopic properties. Moreover, by the reversion of the Kirkwood-Buff theory, it is possible to attain the microscopic details of the radial distribution function from the macroscopic properties. The radial distribution function may also be inverted to predict the potential energy function using the Ornstein-Zernike equation or structure-optimized potential refinement.

Definition

Consider a system of  particles in a volume  (for an average number density ) and at a temperature  (let us also define ).

The appropriate averages are taken in the canonical ensemble , with  the configurational integral, taken over all possible combinations of particle positions.

The total number of particles is huge, so that  in itself is not very useful. To this end, one has to integrate over the remaining coordinates :

 .

If the particles are non-interacting, in the sense that the potential energy of each particle does not depend on any of the other particles, then the partition function factorizes, and the probability of an elementary configuration decomposes with independent arguments to a product of single particle probabilities,

Note how for non-interacting particles the probability is symmetric in its arguments. This is not true in general, and the order in which the positions occupy the argument slots of matters. Given a set of positions, the way that the  particles can occupy those positions is  The probability that those positions ARE occupied is found by summing over all configurations in which a particle is at each of those locations. This can be done by taking every permutation, in the symmetric group on  objects, to write . For fewer positions, we integrate over extraneous arguments, and include a correction factor to prevent overcounting,This quantity is called the n-particle density function. For indistinguishable particles, one could permute all the particle positions, without changing the probability of an elementary configuration, so that the n-particle density function reduces to Integrating the n-particle density gives the permutation factor , counting the number of ways one can sequentially pick particles to place at the  positions out of the total  particles.

For ,  we have the one-particle density. For a crystal it is a periodic function with sharp maxima at the lattice sites. For a non-interacting gas, it is independent of the position  and equal to the overall number density, of the system. To see this first note that  in the volume occupied by the gas, and infinite without. The partition function in this case is 

from which the definition gives the desired result

 

With this in hand, the n-point correlation function  is defined by factoring out the non-interacting contribution,  Explicitly, this definition reads where it is clear that the n-point correlation function is dimensionless.

Relations involving g(r)

The structure factor

The second-order correlation function  is of special importance, as it is directly related (via a Fourier transform) to the structure factor of the system and can thus be determined experimentally using X-ray diffraction or neutron diffraction.

If the system consists of spherically symmetric particles,  depends only on the relative distance between them, . We will drop the sub- and superscript: . Taking particle 0 as fixed at the origin of the coordinates,  is the average number of particles (among the remaining ) to be found in the volume  around the position .

We can formally count these particles and take the average via the expression , with  the ensemble average, yielding:

where the second equality requires the equivalence of particles .

 
, and thus:

, proving the Fourier relation alluded to above.

This equation is only valid in the sense of distributions, since  is not normalized: , so that  diverges as the volume , leading to a Dirac peak at the origin for the structure factor. Since this contribution is inaccessible experimentally we can subtract it from the equation above and redefine the structure factor as a regular function:

 .

Finally, we rename  and, if the system is a liquid, we can invoke its isotropy:

The compressibility equation

The potential of mean force
It can be shown that the radial distribution function is related to the two-particle potential of mean force  by:
In the dilute limit, the potential of mean force is the exact pair potential under which the equilibrium point configuration has a given .

The energy equation
If the particles interact via identical pairwise potentials: , the average internal energy per particle is:

The pressure equation of state
Developing the virial equation yields the pressure equation of state:

Thermodynamic properties in 3D
The radial distribution function is an important measure because several key thermodynamic properties, such as potential energy and pressure can be calculated from it.

For a 3-D system where particles interact via pairwise potentials, the potential energy of the system can be calculated as follows:

Where N is the number of particles in the system,  is the number density,   is the pair potential.

The pressure can be calculated as follows:

Approximations

For dilute systems (e.g. gases), the correlations in the positions of the particles that  accounts for are only due to the potential  engendered by the reference particle, neglecting indirect effects. In the first approximation, it is thus simply given by the Boltzmann distribution law:

If  were zero for all  – i.e., if the particles did not exert any influence on each other, then  for all  and the mean local density would be equal to the mean density : the presence of a particle at O would not influence the particle distribution around it and the gas would be ideal.

As the density of the gas increases, the low-density limit becomes less and less accurate since a particle situated in    experiences not only the interaction with the particle in O but also with the other neighbours, themselves influenced by the reference particle.

This similarity is not accidental; indeed, substituting in the relations above for the thermodynamic parameters (Equations ,  and ) yields the corresponding virial expansions. The auxiliary function  is known as the cavity distribution function. It has been shown that for classical fluids at a fixed density and a fixed positive temperature, the effective pair potential that generates a given  under equilibrium is unique up to an additive constant, if it exists.

In recent years, some attention has been given to develop pair correlation functions for spatially-discrete data such as lattices or networks.

Experimental

One can determine  indirectly (via its relation with the structure factor ) using neutron scattering or x-ray scattering data. The technique can be used at very short length scales (down to the atomic level) but involves significant space and time averaging (over the sample size and the acquisition time, respectively). In this way, the radial distribution function has been determined for a wide variety of systems, ranging from liquid metals to charged colloids.

It is also possible to calculate  directly by extracting particle positions from traditional or confocal microscopy. This technique is limited to particles large enough for optical detection (in the micrometer range), but it has the advantage of being time-resolved so that, aside from the statical information, it also gives access to dynamical parameters (e.g. diffusion constants) and also space-resolved (to the level of the individual particle), allowing it to reveal the morphology and dynamics of local structures in colloidal crystals, glasses, gels, and hydrodynamic interactions.

Direct visualization of a full (distance-dependent and angle-dependent) pair correlation function was achieved by a scanning tunneling microscopy in the case of 2D molecular gases.

Higher-order correlation functions

It has been noted that radial distribution functions alone are insufficient to characterize structural information. Distinct point processes may possess identical or practically indistinguishable radial distribution functions, known as the degeneracy problem. In such cases, higher order correlation functions are needed to further describe the structure.

They can however be measured by coherent X-ray scattering and are interesting insofar as they can reveal local symmetries in disordered systems.

See also
 Ornstein–Zernike equation
 Structure Factor

References

 Widom, B. (2002). Statistical Mechanics: A Concise Introduction for Chemists. Cambridge University Press.
 McQuarrie, D. A. (1976). Statistical Mechanics. Harper Collins Publishers.

Statistical mechanics
Mechanics
Physical chemistry